Astrance is a restaurant in Paris, France.  The chef is Pascal Barbot. In 2012, S.Pellegrino ranked it #18 among the world's 50 best restaurants.  It received three Michelin stars in 2007 and maintained that honor until 2019, when it was demoted to two stars.

In a 2013 review, food writer Elizabeth Auerbach declared that Barbot “belongs to the small but illustrious group of French chefs who have a truly international profile and are thus the ambassadors of modern French cuisine.” She added, “Astrance produces very aesthetic, high-impact dishes, food that is intellectual but not aloof, perfectly tailored but with deep respect for even the humblest ingredient.”

References

External links
 Interview with Pascal Barbot
 Review

Restaurants in Paris
Michelin Guide starred restaurants in France
Buildings and structures in the 16th arrondissement of Paris